Agadi (Mundgod)  is a village in the southern state of Karnataka India. It is located in the Mundgod taluk and it's under kawar districts in Uttara Kannada.

See also
 Uttara Kannada
 Districts of Karnataka

References

External links
 http://Uttara Kannada.nic.in/

Villages in Uttara Kannada district